The 2022 PFF Women's Cup is the 3rd edition of the cup competition. This edition marks the return of competitive women's football in the Philippines, with the PFF Women's League last held in 2019–20. No women's tournament had been held since 2020 due to the COVID-19 pandemic.  This also marks the return on the women's cup itself which was last held in 2015.

The women's cup ran from November 5 to December 17, 2022. The Far Eastern University successfully defended their title by winning 2–0 over the University of the Philippines in the final.

Participating teams 
There were be eight participating teams, including four university teams and two guest clubs.

Personnel and kits

Results

Preliminary round

Knock-out stage
Kaya–Iloilo, Tuloy, Far Eastern University, and the University of the Philippines advanced to the semifinals, as the top four finishing teams in the group stage. The latter two advance to the final.

Semifinal

Third place

Final

Awards
Champions:Far Eastern University
Most Valuable Player: Dionesa Tolentin (FEU)
Best Goalkeeper: Frances Acelo (UP)
Best Midfielder: Charisa Lemoran (Kaya–Iloilo)
Golden Boot: Shelah Mae Cadag (Kaya–Iloilo)
Best Defender: Jennifer Baroin (UP)

Source:Philippine Football Federation

Statistics

Top goalscorers

References

Women's Cup